Yang Yuqing is a Paralympian athlete from China competing mainly in category T12 sprint events.

He competed in the 2008 Summer Paralympics in Beijing, China.  There he won a gold medal in the men's 4 x 100 metre relay - T11-13 event, a bronze medal in the men's 100 metres - T12 event and a bronze medal in the men's 200 metres - T12 event

External links
 

Year of birth missing (living people)
Living people
Paralympic athletes of China
Athletes (track and field) at the 2008 Summer Paralympics
Paralympic gold medalists for China
Paralympic bronze medalists for China
Chinese male sprinters
Medalists at the 2008 Summer Paralympics
Paralympic medalists in athletics (track and field)